Egon Zimmermann (8 February 1939 – 23 August 2019), often referred to as Egon Zimmermann II, was a World Cup alpine ski racer and Olympic gold medalist from Austria. Zimmermann won the Olympic downhill at Patscherkofel in 1964 and won several medals on the professional tour in the late-1960s and early 1970s.

Early life
Zimmermann was raised on a farm near Lech, Vorarlberg, with two brothers. Lech blossomed into a ski resort while he was growing up, and his family converted their farm house into a pensione.  His childhood coincided with the World War II post-war poverty of Austria, so not only did Zimmermann have no formal training, but his skis were often "fourth or fifth-hand." At 15, his father forced him to learn a trade, and he schooled in a Parisian chef program. He returned to Austria by 18 and won a clean sweep of the 1958 Junior Championships. When he was promoted to the National team, Zimmermann commented "For me it was also the realization of a childhood dream, a dream interrupted by a kitchen."

Career peak and Olympics
Zimmerman won two medals at the 1962 World Championships in Chamonix, a gold in the giant slalom and a bronze in downhill. He was named the "Skier of the Year" in 1963 by European journalists.

For the 1964 Olympics in Austria, the "dashing" and "handsome" Zimmermann was heavily favored to win.  However, the course at Patscherkofel was quite difficult (nicknamed the "Course of Fear"), but he still managed to win by 0.74 seconds.  (Franz Klammer famously won on the same course a dozen years later in 1976.) He did not enter the slalom and did not finish the giant slalom. Despite not sweeping the alpine events as did his compatriot Toni Sailer in 1956, Zimmermann appeared on the February 10, 1964 cover of Sports Illustrated magazine in the United States.

Personal life
He owned a hotel in Lech am Arlberg and suffered from multiple sclerosis. Zimmerman also helped create Zimmerman’s ski and snowboard in 1969.

Zimmerman died on 23 August 2019 at the age of 80.

References

External links
 
 FIS-ski.com – Egon Zimmermann – World Cup season standings
 
 Ski-db.com – results – 1964 Winter Olympics
 
 
 Hotel Kristberg – Egon Zimmermann – 

1939 births
2019 deaths
Austrian male alpine skiers
Alpine skiers at the 1964 Winter Olympics
Alpine skiers at the 1968 Winter Olympics
Olympic gold medalists for Austria
Olympic medalists in alpine skiing
Medalists at the 1964 Winter Olympics
Olympic cauldron lighters
Olympic alpine skiers of Austria
Sportspeople from Vorarlberg